Streptomyces tibetensis is a bacterium species from the genus of Streptomyces which has been isolated from soil from the Tibetan Plateau in China.

See also 
 List of Streptomyces species

References 

tibetensis
Bacteria described in 2020